is a railway station in the town of Yamatsuri, Fukushima, Japan operated by East Japan Railway Company (JR East).

Lines

Station layout
The station has two opposed side platforms connected to the station building by a level crossing. The station is attended.

Platforms

History
Higashidate Station opened on April 16, 1930. The station was absorbed into the JR East network upon the privatization of the Japanese National Railways (JNR) on April 1, 1987.

Passenger statistics
In fiscal 2018, the station was used by an average of 80 passengers daily (boarding passengers only).

Bus routes
Fukushima Transportation
For Ōnukari Myōjin
For Kami-myoga via Yamatsuriyama Station and Takachihara-iriguchi
For Oiwake

Surrounding area

Yamatsuri Town Hall
Yamatsuri Industrial Park

See also
 List of Railway Stations in Japan

References

External links

  

Stations of East Japan Railway Company
Railway stations in Fukushima Prefecture
Suigun Line
Railway stations in Japan opened in 1930
Yamatsuri, Fukushima